The Duramax V8 engine is a family of 6.6 liter diesel V8 engines produced by DMAX, a joint venture between General Motors and Isuzu in Moraine, Ohio. The Duramax block and heads are supplied from reliable vendors of General Motors. This engine was initially installed in 2001 Chevrolet and GMC trucks, and has since become an option in pickups, vans, and medium-duty trucks. In 2006, production at Moraine was reportedly limited to approximately 200,000 engines per year. On May 9, 2007, DMAX announced the production of the 1,000,000th Duramax V8 at its Moraine facility, followed by the 2,000,000th on March 24, 2017.

Engine RPO Codes

LB7
RPO LB7 (engine code "1") was first introduced in 2001 and continued until early-2004. It is a 32-valve design with high-pressure common-rail direct injection and an experimental composite design cylinder head.

The following trucks use the LB7:
Chevrolet Kodiak/GMC Topkick
 Chevrolet Silverado/GMC Sierra HD

Specifications
 Block / Head: Cast Iron / Aluminum
 Compression: 17.5:1
 Injection: Direct; Bosch high pressure common-rail
 Power / Torque:  at 3,100 rpm  at 1,800 rpm
The LLY was introduced in 2004 and replaced the LB7 completely mid-year

LLY
The LLY (internally called the 8GF1) (engine code "2") is a  turbocharged engine which debuted in mid-2004 and continued until the end of 2005 (except the Hummer H1 in 2006). It is a 32-valve design with high-pressure common-rail direct injection and aluminum cylinder heads. The LLY was GM's first attempt to implement emissions requirements on their diesel trucks. To meet this goal, they turned to a newly developed Garrett turbocharger with a variable geometry vane system and installed an EGR Valve. Learning from problems with injectors in the previous LB7, GM changed the valve covers to allow access to the injectors without having to remove the valve covers, saving significant labor costs if injector replacement became necessary.

The following trucks used the LLY engine:
 2006-only Hummer H1 Alpha
 Chevrolet Silverado/GMC Sierra HD

Specifications

 Block / Head: Cast gray iron / Cast aluminum
 Compression: 17.5:1
 Injection: Bosch High Pressure Common-rail
 Power / Torque:  at 3000 rpm /  at 1600 rpm
 Head casting is 8gf1
 Block casting is #22351021213

LLY/LBZ
There are two VIN codes for the LBZ. The first is VIN 2 produced in late 2005 and early 2006. The VIN 2 engine is mechanically and physically the same as the VIN D engine but utilizes LLY engine tuning due to the LBZ tuning taking longer to be EPA certified and placed into production.

The second is VIN D. This was introduced in 2006 and continued into 2007 sold only in the "classic" body style. It has an improved engine computer tune that produces increased power and torque over the 2005 LLY version of the engine. First appearance of the Duramax in the Express/Savana vans. The LBZ is one of the more sought after Duramax engines due to its strength, reliability, and being pre-emissions (DPF appeared on the next generation LMM in 2007).

Changes include:
 Cylinder block casting and machining changes strengthen the bottom of the cylinder bores to support increased power and torque
 Upgraded main bearing material increases durability
 Revised piston design lowers compression ratio to 16.8:1 from 17.5:1
 Piston pin bore diameter increased for increased strength
 Connecting rod “ I ” section is thicker for increased strength
 Cylinder heads revised to accommodate lower compression and reduced cylinder firing pressure
 Fuel delivered via higher-pressure pump, fuel rails, distribution lines and all-new, seven-hole fuel injectors
 Fuel injectors spray directly onto glow plugs, providing faster, better-quality starts and more complete cold-start combustion for reduced emissions
 Improved glow plugs heat up faster through an independent controller
 Revised variable-geometry turbocharger is aerodynamically more efficient to help deliver smooth and immediate response and lower emissions
 Air induction system re-tuned to enhance quietness
 EGR has larger cooler to bring more exhaust into the system
 First application of new, 32-bit E35 controller, which adjusts and compensates for the fuel flow to bolster efficiency and reduce emissions

LBZ applications:

 Chevrolet Silverado HD
 Chevrolet Kodiak
 GMC Sierra HD
 GMC TopKick

LLY applications:
 Chevrolet Silverado HD
 Chevrolet Kodiak
 GMC Sierra HD
 Chevrolet Express full-size (reduced power output mated to a 4L85E transmission)
 GMC Savana full-size (reduced power output mated to a 4L85E transmission)

Specifications

 Block / Head: Cast gray iron / Cast aluminum
 Compression: 16.8:1
 Injection: Bosch High Pressure Common-rail
 Power / Torque:

LMM

The LMM (engine code "6") debuted part way through 2007 and ended production with the start of the 2011 calendar year and is mated to the 6-speed Allison transmission. The LMM was the only Duramax offered for model years 2007–2010. A version was used in the Trident Iceni.

Specifications

 Block / Head: Cast gray iron / Cast aluminum
 Compression: 16.8:1
 Injection: Bosch High Pressure Common Rail with CP3.3 Injection Pump
 Power / Torque:  at 3200 rpm /  at 1600 rpm

Emission controls:
 Additional combustion control, including an even more efficient variable-geometry turbocharging system, cooled (enhanced) exhaust gas recirculation (EGR) and closed crankcase ventilation to reduce nitrogen oxides (NOx)
 Additional exhaust control, including oxidizing catalyst and new diesel particulate filter (DPF) to reduce soot and particulate matter
 Increased-capacity cooling system
 New engine control software
 Use of low-ash engine oil (CJ-4)

Applications:
 2007– Chevrolet Silverado HD
 2007– GMC Sierra HD
 Chevrolet Kodiak
 GMC Topkick
 Chevrolet Express/GMC Savana

LGH
The 6.6L Duramax diesel engine (VIN code "L") is used on 2010 interim and 2011 Chevrolet Express and GMC Savana vans and 2011 Chevrolet Silverado/GMC Sierra HD trucks with RPO ZW9 (chassis cabs or trucks with pickup box delete). Similar to the LML this engine also uses a DPF and DEF system to meet emission standards.

LML
The 6.6L RPO LML (VIN code "8") is the 2011–2016 version of the Isuzu/GM Duramax V8 diesel engine. It is a further advanced version of the LMM engine with the majority of the changes addressing a required drastic reduction in engine emissions. Some mechanical aspects of the engine, such as piston oil flow design for improved temperature control and oil pump design, were also improved to enhance durability even further.

The LML engine was significantly updated for 2011 to provide improved exhaust emissions that comply with the new federal emission standards for diesel engines, provide better engine rigidity and further noise reduction. New 29,000 PSI piezo injectors, a complete fuel system-hardening to tolerate up to 20% biodiesel mixtures and urea injection (to reduce nitrogen oxides) with a 5.3 gallon urea tank are updating the fuel and emissions systems. This engine has a fuel injector in the exhaust tract, to allow raw fuel injection during the particulate filter recycling routine.

L5P

L5D
The L5D Duramax is a downrated version of the L5P for the Chevy Silverado MD and International CV trucks (Class 4, 5, and 6). The L5D was downrated to increase reliability and reduce downtime. The L5D was introduced in 2018 for the 2019 model year Chevy Silverado MD and International CV trucks.

See also

 List of GM engines
 Allison 1000 transmission

References

External links
 LML DURAMAX
 Duramax home page
 DMAX, Ltd. home page
 Duramax Diesel Specs
 Duramax timeline

DMAX engines
Diesel engines by model
V8 engines